John Lord Coles (1892-1972), was an English bowls player who competed at the Commonwealth Games.

Bowls career
He participated in the 1954 British Empire and Commonwealth Games at Vancouver, British Columbia, Canada in the fours/rinks event finishing 8th.

Personal life
He was a company director by trade and lived in Harefield, Uxbridge.

References

English male bowls players
Bowls players at the 1954 British Empire and Commonwealth Games
1892 births
1972 deaths
Commonwealth Games competitors for England